Poulton-with-Fearnhead is a civil parish in the Borough of Warrington in Cheshire, England, containing suburbs to the north and east of the town of Warrington.  It contains nine buildings that are recorded in the National Heritage List for England as designated listed buildings, all of which are at Grade II.  This is the lowest of the three gradings given to listed buildings, applied to "buildings of national importance and special interest".  The parish is almost entirely residential, and includes the Warrington suburbs of Padgate, Fearnhead, Cinnamon Brow, Blackbrook, Longbarn, Bruche and Paddington.  The listed buildings are all residential, or related to former farms, other than a church and a milestone.

References
Citations

Sources

Listed buildings in Warrington
Lists of listed buildings in Cheshire